TRD may refer to:

 TRD (gene), encoding the T cell receptor delta locus
 Toyota Racing Development
 Treatment-resistant depression in psychiatry
 Tucson Roller Derby, Arizona, US
 Troed-y-rhiw railway station, Wales, National Rail station code
 Trondheim Airport, Værnes, IATA airport code
 Transition radiation detector